Talut is a character in the Quran traditionally identified with the Israelite king Saul, as he is stated to be the Malik of Israel. He is also identified with Gideon, with the reasoning that the Quran references the same incident of the drinking from a river as found in the Book of Judges (7:5-7) of the Hebrew Bible, alongside other factors associated with the latter.

Name 
The name Talut has an uncertain etymology. Unlike most other figures found in both the Hebrew Bible and the Quran, the Arabic name is not similar to the Hebrew name. According to Muslim exegetes, Talut means "tall" and refers to the extraordinary stature of Saul, which would be consistent with the Biblical account. In explanation of the name, exegetes such as the 11th-century scholar Abu Ishaq al-Tha'labi hold that at this time, the future king of Israel was to be recognized by his height; Samuel set up a measure, but no person in Israel reached the sufficient height except for Saul.

Narrative in the Quran 
After the time of Musa (Moses), the Israelites began to demand a king to lead them into war against their enemies. Consequently, Talut was appointed king by an unnamed prophet of the Children of Israel who announced that Allah had chosen Talut as the new king of Israel. The Israelites questioned the prophet’s decision, lacking respect for Talut due to his lack of wealth. The prophet then told them that Talut was more favoured than they were. He was distinguished from the rest by his great knowledge and by his physique. A sign of his rightful role as king was that Allah had brought back the Ark of the Covenant to Israel for the Israelites. Talut tested his people at a river: whoever drank from it would not follow him in battle excepting one who took from it a handful. Many of them drank, but only the faithful ventured on. Talut then led the Israelites to victory over the army of Goliath, who was killed by Dawud (David). Talut is not considered to be a prophet of Allah, but rather a divinely-appointed king.

Hadith 
Talut is also mentioned in a hadith: "Narrated Al-Bara: The companions of Muhammad, who took part in Badr, told me that their number was that of Talut's companions who crossed the river (of Jordan) with him, and they were over three-hundred-and-ten men. By Allah, none crossed the river with him, but a believer."

See also 
 Saul, the first king of Israel who Talut is traditionally identified with
 Gideon, Biblical character in the Book of Judges who Talut is also identified with by some scholars
 Samuel, the selector of Saul as the king of Israel and announcer of his new kingship to the Israelites
List of people in both the Bible and the Quran

References 

Kings of ancient Israel
People of the Quran
Hebrew Bible people in Islam